Ullanda McCullough is an American pop music singer most noted as a backing vocalist.

Career
McCullough began her singing career at age 13 in Detroit, Michigan. In early 1970s she sang numerous advertising jingles including the 1971 Coca-Cola commercial I'd Like to Teach the World to Sing. In 1974, she was a backing vocalist on Eddie Floyd's album, Soul Street. In 1975, McCullough relocated from Detroit to New York City to continue her career as a background singer. She sang background vocals for Ashford & Simpson, Diana Ross, Tina Turner, Luther Vandross, Quincy Jones, Bette Midler and others.

In 1979 McCullough began a solo career and recorded three albums: Love Zone (1979), Ullanda McCullough (1981) and Watching You Watching Me (1982). Afterward, she returned to singing backup for Billy Joel, the Weather Girls and others. She also provided backing vocals for the animated series, Jem.

Personal life
McCullough became a born-again Christian in the 1990s. She co-authored her biography with Cecil Murphey, Something Special: The Story of Ullanda Innocent, in 1996.

Discography

Studio albums

Compilation albums
 Watching You Watching Me (2014)

Singles

References

Further reading

External links
 
 
 

Ariola Records artists
Atlantic Records artists
American sopranos
American rhythm and blues singers
American soul singers